Mominpur Metro Station is a planned station of the Kolkata Metro in Mominpur, Kolkata, India. The underground station is located beneath Diamond harbour road in Mominpur. It will be a station of Kolkata Metro Line 3. This station will be built in the second phase of the construction of the Kolkata Metro Line 3. There will be two platforms at this station.

References 

Kolkata Metro stations
Railway stations in Kolkata